Platymantis cagayanensis is a species of frog in the family Ceratobatrachidae.
It is endemic to the Philippines, where it is found along the north coast of Luzon Island and on Palaui Island.

Its natural habitats are subtropical or tropical moist lowland forest and subtropical or tropical moist montane forest.
It is threatened by habitat loss.

References

Platymantis
Amphibians of the Philippines
Endemic fauna of the Philippines
Taxonomy articles created by Polbot
Amphibians described in 1999